{{Infobox person
| name        = Ritula Shah
| image       = Ritula_Shah_crop.jpg
| image_size  = 
| caption     = Ritula Shah at the Asian Women of Achievement Awards in 2011
| birth_date  = 
| birth_place = 
| death_date  =
| death_place =
| education   = Haberdashers' Aske's School for Girls, ElstreeUniversity of Warwick
| occupation  = Journalist, broadcaster
| agent       =
| title       =
| spouse      = 
| children    = 
| relatives   =
| family      =
| birthname   = 
| alias       =
| status      = 
| credits     = The World TonightPM
| URL         =
}}
Ritula Shah  (born 1967) is a journalist and news presenter on BBC Radio. She was the main presenter of The World Tonight on BBC Radio 4.

Previously Shah presented Woman's Hour on Radio 4 and was a launch presenter for The World Today on the BBC World Service.

Shah joined The World Tonight as Deputy Presenter and also presented the Saturday edition of PM. From the departure of Robin Lustig until 27 February 2023 Shah was the lead presenter of The World Tonight. Life 
Ritula Harakhchand Shah was born in Barnet. She was educated at Haberdashers' Aske's School for Girls, Elstree before studying history at the University of Warwick and graduating in 1988. She joined the Radio 4 production team, moved from there to regional television news, and then to Today in 1991 as a producer. When The World Today launched on the BBC World Service in 1999, Shah became one of its presenters. She is a presenter on the BBC World Service's The Real Story.

In May 2013, she began a series of eight episodes in the BBC Radio 4 One to One'' series of interviews. As she belongs to a Jain family (the Jain religion is concerned with renunciation), the subjects of her interviews are people whose life has involved renunciation.

References

External links
Ritula Shah's page on the BBC's website

1967 births
Living people
BBC World Service presenters
British radio presenters
British women radio presenters
British journalists
British women journalists
People educated at Haberdashers' Girls' School